During the 1972–73 English football season, Everton F.C. competed in the Football League First Division. They finished 17th in the table with 37 points.

Final league table

Results

Football League First Division

FA Cup

League Cup

Squad

References

1972-73
Everton F.C. season